The Cayman Islands Records in Swimming are the fastest times ever swum by a swimmer representing the Cayman Islands. These records are kept by the Cayman Islands Amateur Swimming Association (CIASA).

CIASA keeps records for both for males and females, for long course (50m) and short course (25m) events. Records are kept in the following events (by stroke):
freestyle: 50, 100, 200, 400, 800 and 1500;
backstroke: 50, 100 and 200;
breaststroke: 50, 100 and 200;
butterfly: 50, 100 and 200;
individual medley: 100 (25m only), 200 and 400;
relays: 4x100 free, 4x200 free, and 4 × 100 medley.

Long course (50m)

Men

|-bgcolor=#DDDDDD
|colspan=9|
|-

|-bgcolor=#DDDDDD
|colspan=9|
|-

|-bgcolor=#DDDDDD
|colspan=9|
|-

|-bgcolor=#DDDDDD
|colspan=9|
|-

|-bgcolor=#DDDDDD
|colspan=9|
|-

Women

|-bgcolor=#DDDDDD
|colspan=9|
|-

|-bgcolor=#DDDDDD
|colspan=9|
|-

|-bgcolor=#DDDDDD
|colspan=9|
|-

|-bgcolor=#DDDDDD
|colspan=9|
|-

|-bgcolor=#DDDDDD
|colspan=9|
|-

Mixed relay

Short course (25m)

Men

|-bgcolor=#DDDDDD
|colspan=9|
|-

|-bgcolor=#DDDDDD
|colspan=9|
|-

|-bgcolor=#DDDDDD
|colspan=9|
|-

|-bgcolor=#DDDDDD
|colspan=9|
|-

Women

|-bgcolor=#DDDDDD
|colspan=9|
|-

|-bgcolor=#DDDDDD
|colspan=9|
|-

|-bgcolor=#DDDDDD
|colspan=9|
|-

|-bgcolor=#DDDDDD
|colspan=9|
|-

|-bgcolor=#DDDDDD
|colspan=9|
|-

Mixed relay

Notes

References
General
Cayman Islands Long Course Records – Men 30 August 2022 updated
Cayman Islands Long Course Records – Women 8 January 2023 updated
Cayman Islands Short Course Records – Men 24 February 2021 updated
Cayman Islands Short Course Records – Women 8 April 2022 updated
Specific

External links
CIASA official website
CIASA records page

Cayman Islands
Records
Swimming